Manheim Township is a township in Lancaster County, Pennsylvania. It was established in 1729. Its southernmost border meets the city limits of Lancaster. Its population, as of the 2020 census, was 44,012.

Government
Residents of Manheim Township elect a five-member Board of Commissioners. Commissioners are elected to serve a four-year term.

As of January 2020, the Board of Commissioners were:

Manheim Township is located within Pennsylvania House of Representatives District 97 represented by Republican Steven Mentzer, and Pennsylvania Senate District 13 is represented Republican Scott Martin. 

The township is represented in the U.S. House of Representatives by Republican Lloyd Smucker.

Geography

Manheim Township does not have its own ZIP code, therefore its residents share postal designations with neighboring municipalities. Residents living in the northernmost parts of the township have a Lititz address, residents living in the central and southern parts of the township have a Lancaster address, and residents living in the easternmost parts of the township have a Leola address.

The unincorporated community of Neffsville is located within Manheim Township.

Demographics

At the 2000 census there were 33,697 people, 12,961 households, and 9,280 families living in the township.  The population density was 1,391.6 people per square mile (537.4/km).  There were 13,434 housing units at an average density of 554.8/sq mi (214.2/km).  The racial makeup of the township was 93.18% White, 1.46% African American, 0.11% Native American, 3.13% Asian, 0.01% Pacific Islander, 1.02% from other races, and 1.09% from two or more races. Hispanic or Latino of any race were 2.77%.

There were 12,961 households, 31.0% had children under the age of 18 living with them, 63.1% were married couples living together, 6.4% had a female householder with no husband present, and 28.4% were non-families. 24.8% of households were made up of individuals, and 12.8% were one person aged 65 or older.  The average household size was 2.47 and the average family size was 2.96.

The age distribution was 23.2% under the age of 18, 5.8% from 18 to 24, 24.9% from 25 to 44, 25.2% from 45 to 64, and 21.0% 65 or older.  The median age was 43 years. For every 100 females, there were 88.3 males.  For every 100 females age 18 and over, there were 83.7 males.

The median annual income for a household in the township was $55,807, and the median annual income for a family was $67,365. Males had a median annual income of $46,940 versus $29,618 for females. The per capita income for the township was $28,730.  About 2.4% of families and 4.0% of the population were below the poverty line, including 3.7% of those under age 18 and 6.1% of those age 65 or over.

Education
Students enrolled in public schools attend Manheim Township School District. The district operates the following schools:
 Manheim Township High School
 Manheim Township Virtual High School
 Manheim Township Middle School
 Landis Run Intermediate School
 Brecht Elementary
 Bucher Elementary
 Neff Elementary
 Nitrauer Elementary
 Reidenbaugh Elementary
 Schaeffer Elementary

The Manheim Township Board of School Directors articulates the policy, budgetary direction and vision for the school district.
It has nine members, elected to terms of four years each.

Places of interest

 Lancaster Airport
 Landis Valley Museum
Landis Woods Park
 Neffsville
 Oregon Mill Complex
 Shreiner Farm

See also
Manheim Township School District
Manheim Township High School

References

External links

1729 establishments in Pennsylvania
Populated places established in 1729
Townships in Lancaster County, Pennsylvania
Townships in Pennsylvania